The Battle of Tekiryaylağı  (Turkish: Tekiryaylağı Muharebesi) took place on Summer 1515 nearby Ovacık, Tunceli and ended with a decisive victory for the Ottoman Empire over the Safavid Empire. It marked the halt of the Safavid offensive over the North Anatolia. The Tekiryaylağı battle was just the one of 41 years of destructive war, which only ended in 1555 with the Treaty of Amasya. Safavid commander Nur-Ali Khalifa as well as most of his troops were killed at the battlefield. But Aykutoğlu Bey survived.

After this battle Tunceli and it's around conquered by the Ottomans. After these occupation, Ottoman army led by the Bıyıklı Mehmed Pasha, prepared for the next battles against Safavids ( Battle of Koçhisar ).

References

Sources 

 Göyünç, N. (1969). XVI’ncı Yüzyılda Mardin Sancağı. İstanbul: İstanbul Üniversitesi Edebiyat Fakültesi. 
 Hoca Sadeddin Efendi. (1585). Tâcü’t-Tevârîh - IV. İstanbul 
 https://islamansiklopedisi.org.tr/biyikli-mehmed-pasa
 Ünal, M. A. (1999). XVI. Yüzyılda Çemişgezek Sancağı. Ankara: Türk Tarih Kurumu. 

1515 in the Ottoman Empire
16th century in Iran
Battles involving the Ottoman Empire
Battles involving Safavid Iran
History of Tunceli Province
Ottoman–Persian Wars
Shia–Sunni sectarian violence